The Callanish III stone circle is one of many megalithic structures around the better-known (and larger) Calanais I on the west coast of the Isle of Lewis, in the Outer Hebrides, Scotland.

Description
The stone circle consists of two concentric ellipses. The outer ring measures about 13.7 by 13.1 metres. It contains 13 stones, of which eight are still standing and five have fallen. The inner ring is a pronounced oval measuring 10.5 by 6.6 metres. Only four stones remain in the inner circle, the tallest of which measures 2.1 metres. There is no sign of a central mound or cairn.

It is just a few hundred metres from the Callanish II stone circle. See also Callanish IV, Callanish VIII and Callanish X for other minor sites.

References

External links

Archaeological sites in the Outer Hebrides
Isle of Lewis
Scheduled monuments in Scotland
Stone circles in Na h-Eileanan Siar